Henry 'Harry' Smith (27 August 1930 - 22 April 2020) was an English former footballer who played as an inside forward. He made 73 appearances in The Football League for his local club of Chester in the 1950s.

Playing career
Smith spent time on the books of Chester and Liverpool after leaving school and then had a spell with Connah's Quay Nomads after serving with the Royal Air Force. In the early 1950s he rejoined Chester, initially as an amateur and then as a part-time professional from 1955 as he combined playing with working as a milkman.

He made his league debut on the final day of 1952–53 against Barrow and went on to score seven times in his 73 league appearances in the next five years. His final league appearance came against Hartlepools United on 28 December 1957, after which he left the club to set up his own milk business. Smith dropped into non–league football with Flint Town United and then played for Pwllheli.

Honours
Chester
Welsh Cup runners–up: 1954–55 (played in final replay).

References

1930 births
2020 deaths
Military personnel from Chester
20th-century Royal Air Force personnel
Royal Air Force airmen
Sportspeople from Chester
English footballers
English Football League players
Association football inside forwards
Chester City F.C. players
Connah's Quay Nomads F.C. players
Flint Town United F.C. players
Pwllheli F.C. players